The Adaptive Public License (APL) is an open-source license from the University of Victoria.  It is a weak copyleft, adaptable template license that has been approved by the Open Source Initiative.

The Initial Contributor for a project sets up the license conditions for that project by choosing their specific options from the license template.  Choices include:

 whether or not to grant patent rights
 governing jurisdiction
 limited attribution and branding clauses
 the scope of how widely the source can be distributed before being obliged to contribute code changes
 the extent to which changes need to be documented

Selected programs licensed under the APL 
 MusicDNS
 SwisTrack

External links 
 The Adaptive Public License

Free and open-source software licenses
Copyleft software licenses